Aciagrion occidentale, green striped slender dartlet, is a species of damselfly in the family Coenagrionidae. It is found in India, Sri Lanka, Maldives, Vietnam and Thailand.

Description and habitat
It is a long slender damselfly with a black spot in blue on the 8th segment of the abdomen. Its thorax is black with lateral azure blue stripes. Its abdomen is extremely slender with black on dorsum of segments 1 to 7 and light blue on the lateral sides. Segment 8 is blue with a narrow triangle black dorsal spot, segment 9 is blue. Segment 10 is black on dorsum and blue on the sides. Female is similar to the male except in the last three abdominal segments. Segment 8 has a broad black mark on doesum, 9 with a small basal dorsal spot, and 10 is entirely blue. 

It flies close to the ground and found in shrub dominated wetlands.  In spite of its delicate build, it enjoys migration by rising high in the air and takes advantage of its lightweight in air currents.

See also
 List of odonates of India
 List of odonata of Kerala

References

External links

Insects of India
Insects of Sri Lanka
Insects of Vietnam
Insects of Thailand
Insects described in 1919
Coenagrionidae